Vyshenky (also Vishenki, German: Wischenka; also called Vishenka in connection with the Hutterites) is a small village in Novhorod-Siverskyi Raion, Chernihiv Oblast, Ukraine. The population is about 500 people. The village is located on the right bank of the Desna River. It belongs to Korop urban hromada, one of the hromadas of Ukraine.

The village played an important role in the history of the Hutterites, because all Hutterites lived there from 1770 to 1802. They were invited to settle there by Peter Alexandrovich Rumyantsev-Zadunaisky (1725–1796), a Russian general, who was governor of the Ukraine, which was at that time called "New Russia".

Until 18 July 2020, Vyshenky belonged to Korop Raion. The raion was abolished in July 2020 as part of the administrative reform of Ukraine, which reduced the number of raions of Chernihiv Oblast to five. The area of Korop Raion was merged into Novhorod-Siverskyi Raion.

References 

Hutterite communities in Europe
Hutterites in Ukraine
Protestantism in Ukraine
Villages in Novhorod-Siverskyi Raion